Ochetorhynchus is a genus of earthcreepers, birds in the family Furnariidae. They are found in open to semi-open habitats in Chile, Argentina, Bolivia and Peru. 

The genus contains the following species:

 Rock earthcreeper, Ochetorhynchus andaecola – formerly in genus Upucerthia.
 Straight-billed earthcreeper, Ochetorhynchus ruficaudus  – formerly in genus Upucerthia.
 Band-tailed earthcreeper, Ochetorhynchus phoenicurus – formerly in monotypic genus Eremobius.
 Crag chilia, Ochetorhynchus melanurus – formerly in monotypic genus Chilia.

References

 SACC (2007). Reinstate Ochetorhynchus and merge Chilia and Eremobius into it. Accessed 2008-10-28.

 
Bird genera